The 2019–20 season was Brentford's 130th year in existence and sixth consecutive season in the Championship. Along with competing in the Championship, the club also participated in the FA Cup and the EFL Cup.

The season covered the period from 1 July 2019 to 4 August 2020.

Transfers

Transfers in

Loans in

Loans out

Transfers out

Pre-season and friendlies

Competitions

Championship

League table

Results summary

Result by matchday

Matches

Play-offs

FA Cup

EFL Cup

First team squad

 Players' ages are as of the opening day of the 2019–20 season.

Statistics

Appearances and goals
Substitute appearances in brackets.

Players listed in italics left the club mid-season
 Source: Soccerbase

Goalscorers 

Players listed in italics left the club mid-season
 Source: Soccerbase

Discipline 

 Players listed in italics left the club mid-season.
 Source: ESPN

International caps 

 Players listed in italics left the club mid-season.
 Only international caps won while contracted to Brentford are counted.

Coaching staff

Source: brentfordfc.com

Kit

|
|
|

Awards 

 Supporters' Player of the Year: Saïd Benrahma
 Players' Player of the Year: Ollie Watkins
 EFL Championship Player of the Year: Ollie Watkins
 London Football Awards EFL Player of the Year: Ollie Watkins
 London Football Awards Manager of the Year: Thomas Frank
 Championship PFA Team of the Year: Saïd Benrahma, Ollie Watkins
 PFA Fans' Championship Player of the Month: Saïd Benrahma (January 2020)
 EFL Championship Manager of the Month: Thomas Frank (June 2020)
EFL Championship Player of the Month: Saïd Benrahma (July 2020)
 EFL Golden Glove: David Raya (shared)
 League Managers Association Performance of the Week: Thomas Frank (2)
 Brentford 7–0 Luton Town, Championship, 30 November 2019
 Fulham 0–2 Brentford, Championship, 20 June 2020

References

Brentford
Brentford F.C. seasons
Brentford
Brentford